Sherbert may refer to

 Sherbert v. Verner, a United States Supreme Court case involving the Free Exercise Clause of the First Amendment to the Constitution
 Sherbert (Pillow Pal), a Pillow Pal bear made by Ty, Inc

See also
 Sharbat (disambiguation)
 Sherbet (disambiguation)